Unalga Island is one of the Fox Islands subgroup of the Aleutian Islands of southwestern Alaska, United States. It lies just northeast of Unalaska Island and across Akutan Pass from Akutan Island to its northeast. It is the westernmost island in the Aleutians East Borough.

References

Further reading
Unalga Island: Block 1054, Census Tract 1, Aleutians East Borough, Alaska United States Census Bureau

Fox Islands (Alaska)
Islands of Aleutians East Borough, Alaska
Uninhabited islands of Alaska
Islands of Alaska